Amazone H. Dreyer GmbH & Co. KG (also known as:Amazone) is a German manufacturer of agricultural machinery and municipal machinery. The headquarters and main plant of the company was founded in 1883 by Heinrich Dreyer and is in Hasbergen-Gaste near Osnabrück.

Amazone produces a wide range of products including fertilizer spreaders, sprayers, seed drills, and tillage machinery. The logo is an Amazon woman riding a horse. Agricultural machinery uses an orange logo and the machinery is green and orange. The municipal machinery uses a green logo, and the machinery is tan with green.

History of the name
Heinrich Dreyer wanted to give a name to his most successful machine. He asked a friend, a teacher in Gaste, what he thought. The friend told Heinrich that his machine was beautiful and very strong on the market. These two attributes of beauty and strength reminded him of an Amazon. This is a heroine in Greek mythology confident, very strong and beautiful.

History of the company

Heinrich Dreyer founded Amazone in 1883, though the Dreyer family had been involved in the manufacture of agricultural machines earlier. The first machines brought to production were grain cleaning machines, later plow cultivators, potato sorters and in 1915 the first fertilizer spreader was put on the market. Early on Dreyer began exporting of his machinery; in 1906 the first grain cleaning machines were sold in Valparaíso, Chile. He substantiated this with his slogan: "We must go out to the world". In 1942, the first potato harvesters were introduced to the market and in 1949 the seed drill machines and 1959, a manure spreader. In the 1960s, the two-disc ZA fertilizer spreaders and D4 seed drills were very successful, which helped Amazone to reach market leadership at this time. In 1967 the company entered into tillage and there developed the first Amazone manufactured PTO driven tillage equipment that could be used with a drill. The harrow and rotary cultivator were also included into the product range. Later, after the German reunification, a variety of passive soil-working machines were added to the market.

In 2008, the Amazone establishment exceeded expectations because for the first time they added interns and other young workers to their workforce. 2009 saw the opening of an extension of the central spare parts warehouse in Hasbergen, which doubled the workflow capacity for spare parts supply by Amazone. That same year, Amazone took over a new manufacturing site for production of large seeders in Hude and began with their production site in Leeden near Tecklenburg with the production of self-propelled sprayer, the Pantera. In addition, the BoniRob, an autonomous field robot for the individual plant-based experimental research, was presented that was developed in cooperation with the University of Applied Sciences Osnabrück, the Robert Bosch GmbH as well as other partners.

Present
In January 2010, a new fertilizer spreader test hall was opened in Hasbergen-Gaste. This information can then quickly be added to the Amazone fertilizer database so when customers ask how their machine should be set, the answer is easily acquired. This test hall is state-of-the-art and a unique feature for a mid-sized company; no other manufacturer has such a building.

After the huge success at the first Amatechnica - Amazone field day in May 2005, this event was repeated in September 2010. Customers and prospective customers from around the world were shown demonstrations of new and long-standing agricultural machinery.

In February 2011, Amazone sold the warehouse technology division to a newly formed company.

Management
Heinrich Dreyer, the original founder of Amazone, had two sons. It was decided that each of his sons would receive half ownership of the company, but only one of their children would be allowed to carry on the company. Both fathers remain active at Amazone. The number of employees is approximately 1700. Amazone exports to over 70 countries, the export share is 75% (in 2012). Amazone's customers are farmers, agricultural contractors, municipalities and related areas.

Manufacturing plants

Amazone also has manufacturing facilities in the following locations:

 Hude near Oldenburg, Germany -
 Forbach, (France) - municipal implements
 Leipzig, Germany - formerly known as BBG - tillage equipment
 Leeden (near Tecklenburg), Germany - AmazoneTechnologieLeeden - Pantera
 Samara, (Russia) - GAG Eurotechnology Samara

Amazone maintains working offices in 5 locations in Germany; Rendsburg, Göttin, Winningen-Mosel, Altheim-Landshut and Gablingen.

Are 6 sales locations in Europe in the United Kingdom, France, Poland, Ukraine, Hungary and Russia.

Current machinery range
The production program includes soil tillage implements, seed drills, mineral fertilizer spreaders and crop protection sprayers. Amazone is a specialist for “Intelligent crop production” in agriculture. In addition Amazone produces implements for park and green maintenance and winter application.

References

External links

 amazone.de
 Amazone Ltd

Agricultural machinery manufacturers of Germany
Companies based in Lower Saxony
German companies established in 1883
Agricultural robotics
Manufacturing companies established in 1883